Fly Fishers International (FFI) is an international 501(c)(3) non-profit organization headquartered in Livingston, Montana. It was founded in 1964 and was formalised a year later in 1965, FFI is an organized voice for fly fishers around the world.  They represent all aspects of fly fishing, which include the art of fly tying, casting, protection of the natural systems that support healthy fisheries and their habitats, which is essential to the sport. Today, the organization's goals are to ensure the legacy of fly fishing worldwide. They focus on conservation, education, and a sense of community.

Origins
In April 1964, the McKenzie River Flyfishers was organized in Eugene, Oregon with the expressed goal of forming a national fly fishing organization. A gathering of prominent fly fishermen from the West Coast of the United States and Gene Anderegg of the Theodore Gordon Flyfishers of New York City occurred in September 1964 in Aspen, Colorado. Gene Anderegg orchestrated a correspondence among many fly fishing clubs, aided by the support of angling notables Lee Wulff and Ed Zern that resulted in the first conclave being held in June 1965.  All the original clubs were from California, Oregon and Washington, with the exception of the Theodore Gordon Flyfishers.

The Federation was first organized as the Federation of Fly Fishermen but the name changed to its current status in the early 1980s.  By 1974 there were 120 clubs and over 7000 members across the United States in the Federation.

Lew Bell and Lee Wulff drafted the original constitution for the Federation and its preamble read:

Notable Members and Participants

 Ted Trueblood,
 Ed Zern
 Pete Hidy
 Polly Rosborough
 Dan Bailey
 Bud Lilly
 Arnold Gingrich
 Joan Wulff
 Lee Wulff
 Roderick Haig-Brown
 Tom Brayshaw
 Lefty Kreh
 Enos Bradner
 Nick Lyons
 Paul Schullery
 John Gierach
 Steve Raymond
 Thomas McGuane
 , Gary LaFontaine
 George Gran
 , Curt Gowdy
 Dave Whitlock
 Gary Borger
 Dave Hughes
 Ernest Schwiebert
 Charles Brooks
 Riley D. Woodford
 Ashley Cooper-Hewitt
 Stanley Walters
 Eric Leiser
 Charles Fox
 Bob Clouser
 Bob Jacklin
 Art Flick
 Mel Krieger
 Mike Swederska,
 Tim Rajeff.

Goals
Fly Fishers International exists to:

 Cultivate and advance the art, science and sport of flyfishing as the most sporting and enjoyable method of angling and the way of fishing most consistent with the preservation and use of game fish resources;
 Be the voice for organized fly fishing;
 Promote conservation of recreational resources;
 Facilitate and improve the knowledge of fly fishing;
 Elevate the standard of integrity, honor, and courtesy of anglers;
 Cherish the spirit of fellowship among anglers everywhere;
 Establish and maintain liaison with other organizations of anglers and conservationists and government agencies concerned with the sport of angling.

Clubs and Councils
The organization is composed of 17 regional councils to which belong over 300 fly fishing clubs as well as individual members. The goal is to support fisheries conservation and educational programs for all fish and all waters. Anywhere fly fishers have an interest, the organization plays a role in furthering its goals through its councils, clubs and members.

 Eastern Rocky Mountain
 Eastern Waters
 Florida
 Great Lakes
 Gulf Coast
 Mid Atlantic
 North Eastern
 Northern California
 Ohio
 Oregon
 Southeastern
 Southern
 Southwest
 Texas
 Upper Midwest Council
 Washington State
 Western Rocky Mountain

Programs

Annual Awards
Fly Fishers International Awards Program was established to recognize those individuals, clubs and other organizations that have made outstanding contributions to the environment, fishery resources, angling literature, the fly tackle industry and the Federation. (Date established)

 Man of the Year (1966) - An award presented annually to that individual or director who has demonstrated unusual devotion to the Federation, and through outstanding contributions has benefited the Federation as a National or international organization
 Woman of the Year (1985) - An award presented annually to that individual or director who has demonstrated unusual devotion to the Federation, and through outstanding contributions has benefited the Federation as a National or international organization
 Order of the Lapis Lazuli (1970) - The ultimate award of the Federation, and is in recognition of services and contributions to Federation that have been prominent and extraordinary, and over many years
 McKenzie Cup (1967) - A rotating award, given annually to that Federation Club which has made an outstanding contribution on behalf of the Federation
 Buz Buszek Memorial Award (1970) - An award plaque presented annually to that person who has made significant contributions to the arts of fly tying
 Dick Nelson Fly Tying Teaching Award (2000) - This award is to be presented to an individual who excels in teaching the art of fly tying to tiers at all skill levels.
 Ambassador Award (1984) - Presented annually to the fly fisher who meets certain high standards of sportsmanship, fishing skill and stream side etiquette in taking and conserving game fish internationally
 Lee Wulff Award (1990) - An award that recognizes a manufacturer or a retail business that demonstrates outstanding innovation in the fly fishing industry through their products and outstanding stewardship for water and fisheries resources.
 Roderick Haig-Brown Award (1991) - The award recognizes a fly fishing author whose work embodies the philosophy and spirit of Roderick Haig-Brown, particularly, a respect for the ethics and traditions of fly fishing and an understanding of rivers, the inhabitants and their environments.
 Silver King Award (1994) - This Federation saltwater award is named after the highly prized saltwater trophy, the Tarpon. It is presented to an individual who has made extraordinary contributions to the sport of saltwater angling over an extended period.
 Conservation Award (1978) - Awarded to an individual, group or organization which has made extraordinary contributions to the conservation of our fisheries resources in the past year.
 Leopold Award (2001) - A person who is honored for a lifetime of fisheries conservation effort and work
 Robert J. Marriott's Scholarship
 J. Stanley Lloyd Conservation Award (1992) - A financial grant for a Federation club working on a current or future project related to fishery conservation enhancement and preservation. Matching funds required and may be on an in-kind basis.
 Dr. James Henshall Warmwater Fisheries Award (1985) - An award to an individual contributing to warmwater fly fishing and fisheries in memory of Dr. James A. Henshall, 19th century author and early advocate for bass as a gamefish.
 Memorial Life Awards - The Memorial Life Membership Award program provides a Federation lifetime membership in the name of an individual who has contributed significantly to the fly fishing. Four funds have been established to support these life membership memorials.
 Don Harger Memorial Life Award (1978)
 Arnold Gingrich Memorial Life Award (1978)
 Lew Jewett Memorial Life Award (1979)
 Charles Brooks Memorial Life Award (1987)
 Lifetime Achievement in Fly Casting Instruction Award (2005) - An award given by the Board of Governors of the Federation Casting Instructor Program in recognition of those who have made significant contributions to the art of fly casting instruction.
 Mel Krieger Fly Casting Instructor's Award (2007) - An award given by the Board of Governors of the Federation Casting Instructor Program in recognition of those who have made significant contributions to the Federation Casting Instructor Certification Program, have dedicated themselves to fly casting instruction and have shared their knowledge with others.

Annual Conclave
The Federation has held an Annual Fly Fishing Fair and Conclave since 1965. The Fly Fishing Fair and Conclave is the Federation's annual education and fundraising event.  The Fair offers workshops, programs, demonstrations on fly tying, fly casting, fly fishing tactics, aquatic entomology, fly rod building, angling ethics, water safety and many related topics.  Anglers and fly fishing experts from around the world attend to support Youth and Women's programs, conservation and education forums, photo contests, and author book signings.

The show includes an exhibit hall where fishing tackle companies, retailers, artists, travel services and other companies that cater to the fly fishing lifestyle offer exhibits and sales of their products.  The 2012 International Fly Fishing Fair and Conclave will be held in Spokane, Washington in July 2012.

Certified Casting Instructor Program
In 1992, the Federation established the Certified Casting Instructor program with the goal to enhance the sport of flyfishing in three important areas:
 1. To educate flycasting instructors
 2. To establish communication between instructors
 3. To offer learners a more accepted entry into our sport and a more qualified group of instructors.

Noted fly caster, Mel Krieger led the effort to establish The Casting Board of Governors (BOG) at the Calgary, Alberta conclave in July 1992. Its founding members are iconic figures in American fly casting or fly fishing.  They were: Gary Borger, Leon Chandler, Chico Fernandez, Jim Green, Lefty Kreh, Mel Krieger, Al Kyte, Steve Rajeff, Bruce Richards, Allan Rohrer, Barbara Rohrer, Doug Swisher, Lou Tabory, Dave Whitlock and Joan Wulff.  The first BOG meeting was held at Park High School in Livingston, Montana, during the 1993 conclave.

The program trains and certifies casting instructors in two tiers—Certified Casting Instructor and Master Casting Instructor. Certification requires candidates to pass a written and performance test.

Fly Fishing Discovery Center

The Federation runs the Fly Fishing Discovery Center, a museum and education center in Livingston, Montana. The museum's Tackle Room chronicles the history of fly fishing with displays of rods, reels, lines, float tubes and art. The Fly Room features thousands of flies tied by masters from around the world. The museum houses the Lewis A. Bell Memorial Fly Fishing Library, a large collection of fly fishing books and journals available for public viewing and research.

Fly Tying Group

The Fly Tying Group was established during the 2007 Conclave in Livingston, Montana as a group of fly tiers whose goal is to develop the art of fly tying at the local, regional, council, national, and international levels. The group hosts workshops that teach demonstration fly tying and run fly tying classes at annual conclaves.

Guides Association
The Guides Association is administered by the Federation as a service to its member guides and to the fly-fishing public. The association aims to connect professional guides with potential clients as well as provide guides some marketing support via the Federation's publications.

National Conservation Committee
Conservation is one of the founding principles of the Federation of Fly Fishers.

Participating in over 40 years of conservation work, the Federation of Fly Fishers contributes to the protection of fisheries and angling opportunities for the future. The National Conservation Committee is composed of representatives from each Federation of Fly Fishers Council.  The Conservation Committee advises and supports conservation efforts with perspective from each Council.

Publications
 The Fly Fisher
 The Osprey - The FFF's acclaimed steelhead conservation newsletter, The Osprey, entered its 20th year of publication in January 2007. This 20-year history records a legacy of steelhead issues found nowhere else.

See also
 American Museum of Fly Fishing
 Trout Unlimited

Further reading

Notes

1965 establishments in Montana
Charities based in Montana
Fly fishing
Non-profit organizations based in Montana
Organizations established in 1965
Park County, Montana
Recreational fishing in the United States
Recreational fishing organizations